Sudur Niharika (1976) is an Indian Bengali film directed by Sushil Mukherjee and produced by Anjana Bhattacharya. It stars Soumitra Chatterjee, Soma Dey, Sumitra Mukherjee, Dipti Roy Bikash Roy, Debashree Roy, Rabi Ghosh and Arindam Ganguly. Music of the film was composed by Manabendra Mukherjee with lyrics penned by Shyamal Gupta.

Cast 
Soumitra Chatterjee
Soma Dey
Sumitra Mukherjee
Dipti Roy
Bikash Roy
Debashree Roy
Rabi Ghosh
Arindam Ganguly

Soundtrack
All songs are composed by Manabendra Mukhopadhyay and written by Shyamal Gupta. 

"Kar Manjir Jhankar" - Manabendra Mukhopadhyay
"Jekhanei Tumi Thako" - Aarti Mukherjee
"Torir Naam Jiban Tori" - Hemanta Mukherjee
"Ahata Pakhi" - Sandhya Mukhopadhyay
"Jiban Maraner Sathi" - Manna Dey, Aarti Mukherjee
"Aaj Ei Raat Jalsar Raat" - Sandhya Mukhopadhyay
"Hokka Karanga Karanga" - Manabendra Mukhopadhyay, Nirmala Mishra, chorus

References

External links 
 

Bengali-language Indian films
1976 films
1970s Bengali-language films
Films scored by Manabendra Mukhopadhyay